State Route 168 is a primary state highway in the South Hampton Roads region of the U.S. state of Virginia. It runs from the border with North Carolina (where it continues as North Carolina Highway 168 towards the Outer Banks) through the independent cities of Chesapeake and Norfolk where it ends in the Ocean View area near the Hampton Roads Bridge-Tunnel.

SR 168 consists of three sections with different characteristics. From North Carolina to the junction with Interstate 64 and Interstate 464, SR 168 is mostly built to freeway standards as a major road into North Carolina; part of it — the Chesapeake Expressway — is a toll road. From I-64 north into downtown Norfolk, SR 168 is a local road; I-464 carries most through traffic. The rest of SR 168, from downtown Norfolk north to Ocean View, is Tidewater Drive, an arterial road with some interchanges, built to carry traffic to the Hampton Roads Bridge-Tunnel before Interstate 64 opened.

SR 168 was originally constructed in the 1930s on the north side of Hampton Roads as Merrimack Trail, mainly as a bypass of U.S. Route 60 from Newport News past Williamsburg (now State Route 143). It was extended across Hampton Roads (via the Newport News-Pine Beach (Norfolk) Ferry) in the mid-1940s, but did not move onto its current alignment to North Carolina until 1957, when the Hampton Roads Bridge-Tunnel opened. As the new freeway (Interstate 64) opened past Williamsburg, SR 168 was shifted to it; it was truncated to its current extent around 1980.

History 
The SR 168 designation was applied in the 1933 renumbering to three individual roadways: State Route 529 (northwest from Newport News towards Lee Hall), State Route 532 (Newport News to Hampton via Shell Road), and State Route 533 (King Street from Rip Rap Road — then State Route 513 — south into Hampton). Another piece, from Hampton east on Pembroke Avenue towards Buckroe Beach, was added to the state highway system in 1932, and was extended to Buckroe Beach in 1936. In the 1930s, SR 168 was extended northwest to State Route 53 (now State Route 30) near Barhamsville. It used Jefferson Avenue and 35th Street in Newport News and Shell Road, Newport News Avenue, Back River Road, Rip Rap Road, King Street, and Pembroke Avenue in Hampton; see State Route 143 (Barhamsville to Hampton) and State Route 351 (Hampton to Buckroe Beach) for more history. It intersected U.S. Route 60 at Anderson's Corner, near Toano in James City County.

Route 168 was part of a system of state-funded highway improvements after World War II which preceded the federally funded Interstate Highway System in Virginia. It provided substantial traffic relief to a number of heavily traveled older U.S. highways, notably including U.S. Route 60 on the Virginia Peninsula and U.S. Route 460 in the Cities of Norfolk and South Norfolk and U.S. Route 17 in Norfolk County (now City of Chesapeake) in South Hampton Roads.

North Carolina to Willoughby Spit
In Chesapeake, the route originally ran along New Green Sea Road, now known as Battlefield Boulevard, due to its proximity from the Battle of Great Bridge. This arterial is now bypassed by several roads: the Chesapeake Expressway (a toll road completed in 2001), the Great Bridge Bypass (a bypass route constructed in 1980 and improved through the 1990s), and the Oak Grove Connector (a link from the Great Bridge Bypass to Interstate 464 completed in 1999). From the north end of the Oak Grove Connector, Route 168 overlaps Interstate 64 until it rejoins Battlefield Boulevard. The sections of the boulevard bypassed by the mentioned roads are now designated State Route 168 Business.

From I-64 in Chesapeake, Route 168 follows several roads until it crosses into the City of Norfolk and eventually runs along Tidewater Drive (following the path of the earlier Cottage Toll Road) until reaching its terminus at West Ocean View Avenue (U.S. Route 60) near Fourth View Street in the Willoughby Spit area.

Crossing the mouth of Hampton Roads
The Route 168 designation formerly continued northwesterly along West Ocean View Avenue and crossed the Hampton Roads Ferry System from Willoughby Bay to Old Point Comfort in the Town of Phoebus in Elizabeth City County (communities which were consolidated into the newly enlarged City of Hampton in 1952).

When it first opened to traffic on November 1, 1957, the Hampton Roads Bridge-Tunnel originally carried the VA-168 designation  (as a toll facility). The Route 168 signage and tolls were both removed when the crossing was expanded in 1976 as part of the federally funded Interstate 64 improvements, which included four-laning the crossing.

On the Virginia Peninsula
The SR 168 designation also formerly applied to a routing on the Virginia Peninsula from Anderson's Corner near Toano west of Williamsburg to the Hampton Roads Ferry landing at Old Point Comfort near Fort Monroe. Known as the Merrimack Trail, the road was a major additional highway which was built in the years prior to the creation of the Interstate Highway System, and was replaced as a major through route by Interstate 64, in segments as that new road was completed.

Small portions of the roadway on the Peninsula originally signed as SR 168 became portions of State Route 30 (from Anderson's Corner to Croaker) and Interstate 64 (Exit 231 to Exit 238). However, most of it from Exit 238 on I-64 east was redesignated as State Route 143, which continues to serve as an alternative to U.S. Route 60 most of its length. After Interstate 64 was completed on the Peninsula, both Routes 60 and 143 with many at-grade intersections and businesses became more major conduits for local traffic than through-traffic routes.

Major intersections

Chesapeake Expressway 
The Chesapeake Expressway is the name of the portion of SR 168 that is a toll road in Chesapeake, Virginia built chiefly to facilitate tourist traffic from the Hampton Roads cities en route to the Outer Banks of North Carolina.  Built to freeway standards, this expressway travels from U.S. Route 17, Interstate 64, and Interstate 464 in northern Chesapeake to near the North Carolina border in the southern part of the city, and traverses the eastern edge of the Great Dismal Swamp, meeting North Carolina Highway 168 at the state line.

The one toll plaza is located near Indian Creek Road.

Construction began in 1999 and the road fully opened in 2001. , tolls for a 2-axle passenger vehicle are $8.00 during weekends between Memorial Day and Labor Day, and $4.00 at all other times (tolls were previously $2.00 and then $3.00 at all times).  E-ZPass is accepted.

State Route 168 Business 

State Route 168 Business is a  business route of SR 168. The entire length is also known as Battlefield Boulevard. This was originally a part of SR 168 before the Chesapeake Expressway was completed. This highway is often used to avoid the toll on the main expressway—drivers travelling North make a left turn at VA 168 Business, then enter the expressway at Hillcrest Parkway.

Great Bridge Bridge 
The Great Bridge Bridge is a double-leaf rolling bascule drawbridge that carries Battlefield Blvd.(SR 168 Business) and spans the Atlantic Intracoastal Waterway in Chesapeake, Virginia. It was constructed in 2004 by the Army Corps of Engineers and is operated by the City of Chesapeake. It has a mean daily traffic of 35,000 vehicles.

Major intersections
The entire route is in the independent city of Chesapeake.

Campostella Bridge
The part of SR 168 that crosses the Elizabeth River utilizes the six-lane Campostella Bridge. The bridge is also the route carrier for US 460. Owned and operated by the city of Norfolk, it serves as an alternate route to the Berkley Bridge, which also crosses the same span of water on Interstate 264.

References

External links

Chesapeake Expressway official website

168
State Route 168
State Route 168